The 1966–67 Maltese First Division was the 52nd season of top-tier football in Malta.  It was contested by 6 teams, and Hibernians F.C. won the championship.

League standings

Results

References
Malta - List of final tables (RSSSF)

Maltese Premier League seasons
Malta 
Premier